Cuadra is a Spanish surname of Asturian-Leonese origin.

People with the name
 Adrián Cuadra (born 1997), Chilean footballer
 Fernanda Cuadra (born 1984), Nicaraguan Olympic swimmer
 Francisco Javier Cuadra (born 1954), Chilean lawyer, academic, and politician
 Jaime Cuadra (born 1970), Peruvian musician
 Joaquín Cuadra, Nicaraguan general and politician
 Jolico Cuadra (1939–2013), Filipino poet and artist
 José de la Cuadra (1903–1941), Ecuadorian writer
 José Vicente Cuadra (1812–1894), President of Nicaragua from 1871 to 1875
 Manuel Cuadra Serrano (born 1957), Nicaraguan footballer
 Maria Cuadra (born 1936), Spanish actress
 Pablo Antonio Cuadra (1912–2002), Nicaraguan poet and artist
 Pablo Cuadra (born 1995), Argentine footballer
 Pedro Lucio Cuadra (1842–1894), Chilean engineer and politician
 Raul Cuadra Chamberlain (1924–1974), Nicaraguan musician and advertiser
 Raúl Cuadra García (born 1953), Mexican politician
 Rodrigo Cuadra (born 1967), Chilean musician, TV presenter, and film critic
 Sabino Cuadra (born 1949), Spanish attorney and politician
 Ulysses Cuadra (born 1987), American actor
 Vicente Cuadra Chamberlain (1919–2000), Nicaraguan advertiser, son of Vicente Cuadra Gómez
 Vicente Cuadra Gómez (1874–1943), Nicaraguan economist

See also
 Casas de Cuadra, a village in Valencia, Spain
 La Cuadra, a municipality and village in La Rioja Province, Argentina
 Carlos Cuadras (born 1988), Mexican boxer
 Joaquín Cuadras (1843–1877), Cuban painter
 Quadra (disambiguation)

References

Spanish-language surnames